Ambalappuzha is a small town in the Alappuzha district of Kerala state, India.

Ambalappuzha is divided into the two panchayats of Ambalapuzha North and Ambalapuzha South.

Demographics
As of 2011 Census, Ambalappuzha had a population of 33,939 with 16,620 males and 17,319 females. Ambalappuzha had an average literacy of 93.2% higher than the national average of 74% and lower than state average of 94%; male literacy was 95.5% and female literacy was 90.9%..

Geography 

Politics
Ambalappuzha assembly constituency is part of Alappuzha (Lok Sabha constituency).

References

External links 

 Ambalapuzha Temple from the book: Temples and Legends of Kerala

Cities and towns in Alappuzha district